Thung Thong is a tambon (subdistrict) of Sai Thong Watthana District, in Kamphaeng Phet Province, Thailand. In 2019 it had a total population of 7,268 people.

History
The subdistrict was created effective August 1, 1984 by splitting off 8 administrative villages from Thung Sai.

Administration

Central administration
The tambon is subdivided into 11 administrative villages (muban).

Local administration
The whole area of the subdistrict is covered by the subdistrict administrative organization (SAO) Thung Thong (องค์การบริหารส่วนตำบลทุ่งทอง).

References

External links
Thaitambon.com on Thung Thong
Thung Thong subdistrict administrative organization

Tambon of Kamphaeng Phet Province
Populated places in Kamphaeng Phet province